Underground Connection is a collaborative studio album by American rapper PMD and Japanese producer DJ Honda. It was released on April 27, 2002 via DJ Honda Recordings, and is produced entirely by DJ Honda. The album features guest appearances from 275, Buttah, CB Mass, Devyn, Don Fu-Quan, J-Boogie and Rob Jackson.

Track listing
"Underground Connect"  
"Beginning To End" (Live)  
"Beginning To End"  
"Honda 1"  
"Constant Elevation"  
"Bruce"  
"Who Could You Trust"  
"EPMD" (Live)  
"Look At U"  
"Police"  
"Rhyme 4 Me"  
"Hip Hop Universal"  
"Know What I Mean" 
"How Many"  
"Love Is Love"  
"Banger"  
"Rocksteady"  
"Watch Me" 
"New Joint"  
"Underground Connect"

External links

2002 albums
DJ Honda albums
PMD (rapper) albums
Albums produced by DJ Honda